The C battery (C size battery or R14 battery) is a standard size of dry cell battery typically used in medium-drain applications such as toys, flashlights, and musical instruments.

As of 2007, C batteries accounted for 4% of alkaline primary battery sales in the United States. In Switzerland as of 2008, C batteries totalled 5.4% of primary battery sales and 3.4% of secondary (rechargeable) battery sales.

Properties 

A C-battery measures  length and  diameter.

The voltage and capacity of a C-size battery depends on the battery chemistry and discharge conditions. The nominal voltage is 1.5V. Alkaline C batteries have a storage capacity  up to 8000 mAh while rechargeable NiMH C batteries can hold up to 6000 mAh. Zinc-carbon C batteries usually hold up to 3800 mAh. Compared to the AAA and AA batteries, C-batteries' storage capacities are significantly higher.

Standardisation 
Like the D battery, the C battery size has been standardized since the 1920s.  The AA, AAA, and N sizes have been in common use since the 1950s.

The C battery is called "14" in current ANSI standards of battery nomenclature, and in IEC standards is designated "R14".

Other common names 

 U11 (In Britain  until the 1980s)
 MN1400
 MX1400
 Baby
 Bébielem (Hungary)
 Type 343 (Soviet Union/Russia)
 BA-42 (US Military Spec World War II–1980s)
 UM 2 (JIS)
 #2 (China)
 6135-99-199-4779 (NSN) (carbon-zinc)
 6135-99-117-3212 (NSN) (alkaline)
 HP-11
 Mezza torcia (Italy)
 Pila Mediana (Argentina)
 Pilha média (Brazil)
 Pin Trung (Vietnam)

See also 
 Battery holder
 List of battery sizes

References

External links

Brand Neutral Drawing Of Alkaline C Battery Based On ANSI Specifications
Brand Neutral Drawing Of NiCd C Battery Based On ANSI Specifications
Brand Neutral Drawing Of NiMH C Battery Based On ANSI Specifications
Energizer C Size Battery Specification for Alkaline Cell
 A datasheet for a C size battery: 

Battery shapes